Microsoft Bookshelf is a discontinued reference collection introduced in 1987 as part of Microsoft's extensive work in promoting CD-ROM technology as a distribution medium for electronic publishing.  The original MS-DOS version showcased the massive storage capacity of CD-ROM technology, and was accessed while the user was using one of 13 different word processor programs that Bookshelf supported.  Subsequent versions were produced for Windows and became a commercial success as part of the Microsoft Home brand.  It was often bundled with personal computers as a cheaper alternative to the Encarta Suite. The Encarta Deluxe Suite / Reference Library versions also bundled Bookshelf.

Content
The original 1987 edition contained:

 The Original Roget's Thesaurus of English Words and Phrases
 The American Heritage Dictionary of the English Language
 World Almanac and Book of Facts
 Bartlett's Familiar Quotations
 The Chicago Manual of Style (13th Edition)
 the U.S. ZIP Code Directory
 Houghton Mifflin Usage Alert, Spelling Verifier and Corrector, Business Information Sources, and Forms and Letters.

Titles in non-US versions of Bookshelf were different. For example, the 1997 UK edition (Bookshelf British Reference Collection) included the Chambers Dictionary, Bloomsbury Treasury of Quotations, and Hutchinson Concise Encyclopedia.

The Windows release of Bookshelf added a number of new reference titles, including The Concise Columbia Encyclopedia and an Internet Directory. Other titles were added and some were dropped in subsequent years.  By 1994, the English-language version also contained the Columbia Dictionary of Quotations; The Concise Columbia Encyclopedia; the Hammond Intermediate World Atlas; and The People's Chronology. By 2000, the collection came to include the Encarta Desk Encyclopedia, the Encarta Desk Atlas, the Encarta Style Guide and a specialized Computer and Internet Dictionary by Microsoft Press.

Microsoft Bookshelf was discontinued in 2000. In later editions of the Encarta suite (Encarta 2000 and onwards), Bookshelf was replaced with a dedicated Encarta Dictionary, a superset of the printed edition. There has been some controversy over the decision, since the dictionary lacks the other books provided in Bookshelf which many found to be a useful reference, such as the dictionary of quotations (replaced with a quotations section in Encarta that links to relevant articles and people) and the Internet Directory, although the directory is now obsolete since many of the sites listed in offline directories no longer exist.

Technology

Bookshelf 1.0 engine
Bookshelf 1.0 used a proprietary hypertext engine that Microsoft acquired when it bought the company Cytation in 1986. Also used for Microsoft Stat Pack and Microsoft Small Business Consultant, it was a terminate-and-stay-resident program that ran alongside a dominant program, unbeknownst to the dominant program. Like Apple's similar Hypercard reader, Bookshelf engine's files used a single compound document, containing large numbers of subdocuments ("cards" or "articles").  They both differ from current browsers which normally treat each "page" or "article" as a separate file.

Though similar to Apple's Hypercard reader in many ways, the Bookshelf engine had several key differences. Unlike Hypercard files, Bookshelf files required compilation and complex markup codes. This made the files more difficult to pirate, addressing a key concern of early electronic publishers. Furthermore, Bookshelf's engine was designed to run as fast as possible on slow first-generation CD-ROM drives, some of which required as much as a half-second to move the drive head. Such hardware constraints made Hypercard impractical for high-capacity CD-ROMs. Bookshelf also had full text searching capability, which made it easy to find needed information.

Bookshelf 2.0 engine
Collaborating with DuPont, the Microsoft CD-ROM division developed a Windows version of its engine for applications as diverse as document management, online help, and a CD-ROM encyclopedia. In a skunkworks project, these developers worked secretly with Multimedia Division developers so that the engine would be usable for more ambitious multimedia applications. Thus they integrated a multimedia markup language, full text search, and extensibility using software objects, all of which are commonplace in modern internet browsing.

In 1992, Microsoft started selling the Bookshelf engine to third-party developers, marketing the product as Microsoft Multimedia Viewer. The idea was that such a tool would help a burgeoning growth of CD-ROM titles that would spur demand for Windows. Although the engine had multimedia capabilities that would not be matched by Web browsers until the late 1990s, Microsoft Viewer did not enjoy commercial success as a standalone product. However, Microsoft continued to use the engine for its Encarta and WinHelp applications, though the multimedia functions are rarely used in Windows help files.

Viewer 3.0
In 1993, the developers who were working on the next generation viewer were moved to the Cairo systems group which was charged with delivering Bill Gates' 'vision' of 'Information at your fingertips'.  This advanced browser was a fully componentized application using what are now known as Component Object Model objects, designed for hypermedia browsing across large networks and whose main competitor was thought to be Lotus Notes.  Long before Netscape appeared, this team, known as the WEB (web enhanced browser) team had already shipped a network capable hypertext browser capable of doing everything that HTML browsers would not be able to do until the turn of the century.  Nearly all technologies of Cairo shipped.  The WEB browser was not one of them, though it influenced the design of many other common Microsoft technologies.

Reception
BYTE in 1989 listed Microsoft Bookshelf as among the "Excellence" winners of the BYTE Awards, stating that it "is the first substantial application of CD-ROM technology" and "a harbinger of personal library systems to come".

Versions
 Versions for DOS/Windows/Mac:
 Bookshelf 1987 Edition for MS-DOS
 Bookshelf 1.0 (March 1991)
 Bookshelf 1991 Edition (October 1991)
 Bookshelf 1992 Edition
 Bookshelf 1993 Edition (Not For Retail Sale, bundled with Tandy Sensation!)
 Bookshelf '94 (February 2, 1994)
 Bookshelf '95 (first 32-bit version with some discs e.g. Microsoft Office 95 Professional, also 16-bit version for compatibility with Windows 3.x ) This version uses Indeo 3.2 codec to play videos, 32-bit version still has 16-bit components for playing animations.
 Bookshelf British Reference Collection (BRC)
 Bookshelf 1996-'97 Edition (Last version for Windows 3.1)  It still uses 16-bit components for certain areas of Bookshelf like animations.
 Bookshelf 98 for Windows and Macintosh (Last version for Macintosh). The Windows version uses QuickTime 2.1.2 for Windows for 360° animations besides Indeo codec. It still uses 16-bit components for certain areas of Bookshelf like animations.
 Bookshelf 99 (this version switched to Shockwave Player ActiveX Control for media content and Encarta Image control for images). This is the first version integrated with the Encarta engine and uses purely 32-bit processes
 Bookshelf 2000 (last English version for Windows)
 Bookshelf 3.0 Japanese (last version for Windows)

Contents by version

References

Bookshelf
Educational software for Windows
Reference works
Windows text-related software